The Basketball competitions in the 1961 Summer Universiade were held in Sofia, Bulgaria.

Men's competition

Final standings

Women's competition

Final standings

External links
https://web.archive.org/web/20100116184925/http://sports123.com/bsk/wun.html
https://web.archive.org/web/20100116184920/http://sports123.com/bsk/mun.html

Basketball
Summer Universiade
1961
Universiade